The 1926 Norwegian Football Cup was the 25th season of the Norwegian annual knockout football tournament. The tournament was open for all members of NFF, except those from Northern Norway. Odd won their 10th title, having beaten Ørn in the final. Brann were the defending champions, but were eliminated by Urædd in the quarterfinal.

First round

{{OneLegResult|Vard||5–0|Stord'}}

|-
|colspan="3" style="background-color:#97DEFF"|Replay|}

Second round

|-
|colspan="3" style="background-color:#97DEFF"|Replay|}

Third round

|-
|colspan="3" style="background-color:#97DEFF"|Replay|}

Fourth round

|-
|colspan="3" style="background-color:#97DEFF"|Replay|}

Quarter-finals

|}

Semi-finals

|-
|colspan="3" style="background-color:#97DEFF"|Replay''

|}

Final

See also
1926 in Norwegian football

References

Norwegian Football Cup seasons
Norway
Cup